Feldbach is a village near Rapperswil, Switzerland. It is located on the north bank of the lake of Zurich and is part of the political municipality of Hombrechtikon. In the local dialect it is called Fäldbach.

Geography 
Situated on Zürichsee lake shore, Feldbach is neighboured by Kempraten, nearby the Seedamm, an isthmus between the Zürichsee and the Obersee lake area.

Cultural Heritage 

The Prehistoric pile dwelling site Seegubel was in close vicinity to the prehistoric lake crossings, and neighboured by three other Prehistoric pile dwelling settlements: Freienbach–Hurden Rosshorn, Freienbach–Hurden Seefeld and Rapperswil-Jona–Technikum. As well as being part of the 56 Swiss sites of the UNESCO World Heritage Site Prehistoric pile dwellings around the Alps, the Prehistoric settlmemnt Seegubel is also listed in the Swiss inventory of cultural property of national and regional significance as a Class object.

Notable people 
 Thomas Frischknecht, Swiss cyclist

Transportation 
Feldbach railway station is a stop of the S-Bahn Zürich on the line S7.

References

External links 

  

Villages in the canton of Zürich
Populated places on Lake Zurich
Hombrechtikon

de:Feldbach
pnb:فلڈباخ